Conselheiro Lafaiete is a city of the state of Minas Gerais, Brazil. It was known as Queluz until 1934, when it was renamed by decree, as a tribute to Counselor Lafayette Rodrigues Pereira

It is situated 96 km south from Belo Horizonte, capital of Minas Gerais, in one of the most important economic areas of Brazil.  The population was 129,606 inhabitants, in 2020. It is one of the most populated cities of MG.

Geography 
According to the modern (2017) geographic classification by Brazil's National Institute of Geography and Statistics (IBGE), the municipality belongs to the Immediate Geographic Region of Conselheiro Lafaiete, in the Intermediate Geographic Region of Barbacena.

See also
 List of municipalities in Minas Gerais

References

Municipalities in Minas Gerais